Alfons Groenendijk (born 17 May 1964) is a Dutch former professional footballer and current assistant coach of Antalyaspor.

Club career
During his career, Groenendijk played for ADO Den Haag, Roda JC, Ajax, Manchester City, Sparta Rotterdam, and Utrecht. With Ajax, he won the 1991–92 UEFA Cup and the 1992–93 KNVB Cup.

Managerial career
Groenendijk has been appointed assistant manager of Willem II for the 2008–09 season. He was previously a manager of Jong Ajax and amateur side VV Katwijk. He became manager of Willem II in February 2009, succeeding Andries Jonker who became director of football for Willem II. On 19 February 2010, Willem II decided to sack Groenendijk.

Honours
Ajax
KNVB Cup: 1992–93
UEFA Cup: 1991–92

Notes

References

External links
Alfons Groenendijk at Beijen.net

1964 births
Living people
Expatriate footballers in England
Dutch expatriate footballers
Dutch footballers
Association football midfielders
Dutch football managers
Eredivisie players
Eerste Divisie players
Premier League players
ADO Den Haag players
Roda JC Kerkrade players
AFC Ajax players
Manchester City F.C. players
Sparta Rotterdam players
FC Utrecht players
Footballers from Leiden
AFC Ajax non-playing staff
Willem II (football club) managers
FC Den Bosch managers
Jong Ajax managers
Excelsior Rotterdam managers
ADO Den Haag managers
UEFA Cup winning players
Eredivisie managers
Willem II (football club) non-playing staff